The J.League Cup 2003, officially the 2003 J.League Yamazaki Nabisco Cup, was the 1st edition of Japan soccer league cup tournament and the 11th edition under the current J.League Cup format. The championship started on March 8, and finished on November 3, 2003.

Teams from the J1 took part in the tournament. Kashima Antlers and Shimizu S-Pulse were given a bye to the quarter-final due to their qualification for the AFC Champions League. The rest of 14 teams started from the group stage, where they're divided into four groups. The group winners of each group qualifies for the quarter-final along with the runners-up of group A and B, and the two teams which qualified for the AFC Champions League.

Group stage

Group A

Group B

Group C

Group D

Knockout stage

Quarter finals

First leg

Second leg

Semi finals

First leg

Second leg

Final

Top goalscorers

Awards 
 MVP: Tatsuya Tanaka (Urawa Red Diamonds)
 New Hero Prize: Tatsuya Tanaka (Urawa Red Diamonds)

References 
 J.League Official Site 

J League Cup, 2003
2003
League Cup, 2003